Western Union Band was a band from Singapore in the 1970s. They had major hits in Singapore and Malaysia with "Driving Me Crazy", "I've Found My Freedom" and  "Sausalito".

Background
The band was a made of men from Indian, Chinese and Malay origin. They played regularly at the Moonshine bar in Katong.
The group evolved out of Rubber Band which was formed in 1969 by Chris Vadham. Vadham had previously been in a band called High Ground. Bass player Tony Chong was founding member of the early 60s band The Thunderbirds, whose biggest hit was in 1966 with "My Lonely Heart".

Career
Before the year of 1971 was out, the group had released the singles, "My Lady" bw "Stepping Thru" and "Something About You" bw "Driving Me Crazy". Both of them were on the Libra Records label.

Hits
For the week ending February 19th,  1972, their song "Baby, Driving Me Crazy" was at no.6 in the Malaysian Top 10. A month later, for the week ending March 18th, the song was at no.4. For the week ending April 8th, Billboard had recorded "Something About You Baby" at no.7.

In May, on the 27th, they were in the Singapore top 10 at no.9 with "Ive Found My Freedom". The following week, the song was also in the Singapore Top 10 at no.8. For the week ending June 24th, the song was at no.8 in Singapore, but it had hit the no.1 spot in Malaysia.

Their song Sausalito was at no.1 in the Malaysian Top 10 by August 26, 1972.

Members
 Rennie Ho ... vocals
 Chris Vadham ... guitar, vocals
 Abel Gan ... keyboards
 Tony Chong ... bass
 Shediq Marican (aka Ziani Shedick) ... drums
 Danny Lim ... guitar, flute
 Peter Mangkok ... bass
 Daniel Wee ... drums
 Benji ... vocals

Discography

Later years
Chris Vadham died in Watford, England on February 26, 2007 from liver cancer. 
 
In 2014 Tony Chong was in a band called Tru-Blu, whose members included Gerry and Michael Pereira who had been in The Mccoys and Duncan Anthony who has been with Tin Pan Alley, Rusty Blades and New Breed.

References

External links
 Singapore 60s: Andy's Pop Music Influence: Western Union Band With Chris Vadham: Paper Roses, Paper Dreams... Yesterday's Sorrows
 ANNEX C – Pop-Up Noise: The Great Singapore Replay Song List for Public Voting

Singaporean musical groups